Wombat is a town in South West Slopes region of New South Wales, Australia. It is in the local government area of Hilltops Council.

History
The area was occupied by the indigenous Wiradjuri people for thousands of years.
 1860 – Gold discovered at nearby Young. 20,000 miners converge on surrounding areas. Wombat Post Office opened on 16 July 1862.
 1865 – The village of Wombat was established. Many Chinese miners moved to the area taking plots of land.
 1867 – Wombat Public School was founded in a bark hut
 1873 – foundation stone of St Matthew's Church of England laid
 1875 – Roman Catholic Church built
 1877 – Wombat Hotel began trading
 1880 – Carlo Lazzarini, (1880–1952), NSW politician and trade unionist was born in Wombat
 1895 – Mechanics Institute opened
 1903 – Wombat Hotel's current building constructed
 1910 – Roman Catholic convent opened
 1921 – shop and post office destroyed by fire
 1923 – Wombat Soldiers' Memorial hall officially opened
 1924 – the old hall was destroyed by fire
 1950s & 1960s – The Olympic Way highway was built through

Attractions

 "The Wombat Hotel", which has had a continuous liquor licence since 1877, making it the longest in New South Wales.
 "Allambie Orchard", A cherry orchard that allows people to pick their own fruit in season
 "Wombat Heights", a farm on a hill which produces jam, fruit wine and liqueurs from traditional recipes. Visitors are invited to do-it-themselves.
 "Wilkies Cottage Restaurant/Café".
 "The Old Convent Geranium Nursery", Hope St, offers many colours & varieties of miniatures of variegated, climbing and scented Pelargonium geraniums.

The highway into Wombat is graced with a statue of a wombat, made of local material, which was unveiled in 2002.

References

External links 

  Wombat Public School Website
 Wombat Progress Association History page
 Harden Shire Council Wombat Public School Web Page
 Wombat Early Settlement History

Towns in New South Wales
Hilltops Council

Mining towns in New South Wales